Al Rodrigo is an American character actor who has starred in theatre, films and on television since the 1980s.

Early life and education 
Rodrigo was born in New York City to Puerto Rican parents. He graduated from the High School of Performing Arts and received a BFA in theatre from Syracuse University.

Career 
Some of his film credits include Last Rites, The Glass Shield, Brown's Requiem, The Great White Hype, The Birdcage, and House of Sand and Fog, and others. 

Rodrigo has made many guest appearances on TV shows, including Truth Be Told, Mayans MC, Martin, Something Wilder, SeaQuest DSV, Beverly Hills, 90210, ARLI$$, The West Wing, Wanted, High Incident, CSI: Miami, Days of Our Lives, and Supernatural. He also guest starred in Star Trek: Deep Space Nine in the season three two-part episode "Past Tense" as Bernardo Calvera, and numerous others.

He is the voice of Quinlan Vos in season three of Star Wars: The Clone Wars. Among some of his many voice over credits are the animated features Spider-Man: Into the Spider-Verse, Bilal: A New Breed of Hero, Penguins of Madagascar, Mr. Peabody and Sherman, Coco, and others. In video games he is the voice of Padre Sebastian and Gallo in Cyberpunk 2077, Oscar Diaz in Gears 5, Grand Theft Auto V, Uncharted 4: A Thief's End, Fallout 76, Asura's Wrath, Army of Two: The Devil's Cartel, Tomb Raider, Call of Duty: Black Ops, and Dishonored, and others. He also does extensive work in the ADR community on numerous film and television projects.

Filmography

Film

Television

Video games

Adr Loop Group

References

External links
 

Male actors from New York City
American male film actors
American male television actors
Living people
American male voice actors
20th-century American male actors
Year of birth missing (living people)